Villanueva de la Reina is a town located in the province of Jaén, Spain. According to the 2005 census (INE), the town has a population of 3352 inhabitants.

References

Municipalities in the Province of Jaén (Spain)